Lambari River may refer to:

 Lambari River (Pará River)
 Lambari River (Verde River)

See also 
 Lambari (disambiguation)